John Robert Kelly (born June 6, 1946) is a Canadian former professional ice hockey player who played 425 games in the National Hockey League. He played for the St. Louis Blues, Pittsburgh Penguins, and Chicago Black Hawks. Although official NHL records cite him as Bob Kelly, he was commonly known during his NHL career as J. Bob Kelly to differentiate himself from the Bob Kelly who played primarily with the Philadelphia Flyers at that time. Known for his size, strength and toughness, he was nicknamed "Battleship" during his playing days.

Career statistics

References

External links 

1946 births
Canadian ice hockey left wingers
Chicago Blackhawks players
Ice hockey people from Ontario
Living people
Pittsburgh Penguins players
Sportspeople from Thunder Bay
St. Louis Blues players
Toronto Maple Leafs draft picks